Jonas Halling (born 16 November 1989) is a Danish professional football player.

External links
  Vejle Boldklub profile

Living people
1989 births
Danish men's footballers
Vejle Boldklub players

Association football midfielders